The Shoppach House is a historic house at 508 North Main Street in Benton, Arkansas.  Its front section is a brick structure,  stories in height, from which a single-story wood-frame ell extends to the rear.   The house was built in 1852 by John Shoppach, and was the first brick house in Saline County.  Shoppach's original plan called for the brick section to be organized similar to a typical dogtrot, with a central breezeway flanked by two rooms.  The house was occupied by five generations of the Shoppach family.

The house was listed on the National Register of Historic Places in 1975.

See also
National Register of Historic Places listings in Saline County, Arkansas

References

Houses on the National Register of Historic Places in Arkansas
Houses completed in 1852
Houses in Saline County, Arkansas
National Register of Historic Places in Saline County, Arkansas
1852 establishments in Arkansas
Benton, Arkansas